Phantom Radio is the ninth studio album by alternative rock artist Mark Lanegan, performing as the "Mark Lanegan Band". It was released on October 21, 2014, on Vagrant Records.
In an interview with The Quietus, Lanegan stated that he used a phone app called FunkBox to write the drum parts on some of the songs.

Track listing

Disc 1

Disc 2 – No Bells on Sunday EP

Personnel
 Mark Lanegan - vocals (all tracks), acoustic guitar (9)
 Alain Johannes - guitar (1,10), bass (1,10), Prophet 5 (1,3,4,7,8,10), percussion (1,4,5,8,10), backing vocals (1,3,5,7), harmonium (2), acoustic guitar (2,6), verb guitar (3), electric guitar (4,7,8), pocket piano (4), Moog bass (5), wah guitar (5), Wurlitzer (5), saxophones (5), flutes (5), filter Moog (5), Brushverb guitar (6), E-bow guitar (6), kick drum (7), tambourine (7), Mellotron (8), electronic drums (8), Rhodes (10)
 Martyn LeNoble - bass (3,8), fretless bass (7), upright bass (9)
 Jack Irons - drums (1)
 Aldo Struyf - synthesizer (3,5,8,10), ARP synthesizer (3,7), electric guitar (3,5,7), percussion (3), synthetic horns (7), sampled horns (10)
 Sietse Van Gorkom - synthesizer (4), bass (4), saloon piano (4), acoustic guitar (4), strings (4,9), clarinet (4), electronic drums (4)
 Shelley Brien - backing vocals (3,5,8)
 Jean-Philippe De Gheest - drums (9,10)
 Jeff Fielder - acoustic guitar (9), Leslie guitar (9)
 Brett Nelson - end solo guitar (7)

Charts

Weekly charts

Year-end charts

References

2014 albums
Mark Lanegan albums
Vagrant Records albums
Blues albums by American artists
Folktronica albums
Albums produced by Alain Johannes